Gulzar is Union council of Kharan District in the Balochistan province of Pakistan. It is located at 28°1'0N 63°26'0E with an altitude of 540 metres (1774 feet).

References

Populated places in Kharan District